Kenneth Daniel Gallegos Miyagishima (born May 15, 1963) is an American businessman and politician serving as the mayor of Las Cruces, New Mexico. Miyagishima took office in 2007.

Early life and education
Miyagishima was born in Biloxi, Mississippi. He is of both Mexican and Japanese descent. He has lived in Las Cruces, New Mexico since 1971. He attended public schools and in 1985 graduated from New Mexico State University with degrees in finance and real estate.

Career 
In 1984, Miyagishima began his insurance and financial services business while still in college.

In 1992, he became New Mexico's first American of Japanese descent to be elected to public office. From 1998 through 2000, he was voted "Best County Commissioner" in a local newspaper readers' poll. In 2002, he received the Commander's Award for Public Service from the United States Department of the Army. Miyagishima won re-election to the city council in 2005. Miyagishima is the first American of Japanese and Mexican descent to be elected mayor of Las Cruces. He is also the second person in Doña Ana County to have been elected both chairman of the Doña Ana County Commission and mayor of Las Cruces.

In August 2013, Miyagishima unsuccessfully applied to become Doña Ana County Manager.

In 2019, Miyagishima was re-elected to his fourth term as mayor of Las Cruces.

In the 2020 Democratic Party presidential primaries, Miyagishima was one of several mayors to pledge support for Michael Bloomberg. After Bloomberg dropped out of the race, Miyagishima endorsed Joe Biden.

Personal life 
Ken is married to Rosario Miyagishima (née Rodriguez), and they have four children.

References

External links
Greater Las Cruces Chamber of Commerce Forum October 2, 2007 speech on YouTube
Obama likely to roll through New Mexico ahead of Super Tuesday The New Mexican, January 27, 2008, endorsement of Barack Obama

1963 births
Living people
Mayors of Las Cruces, New Mexico
American mayors of Japanese descent
American politicians of Japanese descent
American politicians of Mexican descent
Hispanic and Latino American mayors
County commissioners in New Mexico
New Mexico Democrats
People from Biloxi, Mississippi
People from Las Cruces, New Mexico
People from Doña Ana County, New Mexico
New Mexico State University alumni
Hispanic and Latino American people in New Mexico politics
Asian-American city council members
New Mexico city council members